The Men's Cathay Pacific Hong Kong Open 2012 is the men's edition of the 2012 Hong Kong Open, which is a PSA World Series event Platinum (prize money: 150 000 $). The event take place in Hong Kong from 27 November to 2 December. Ramy Ashour won his second Hong Kong Open trophy, beating James Willstrop in the final.

Prize money and ranking points
For 2012, the prize purse is $150,000. The prize money and points breakdown is as follows:

Seeds

Draw and results

See also
Hong Kong Open (squash)
Women's Hong Kong squash Open 2012
2012 Men's World Open Squash Championship
PSA World Tour 2012
PSA World Series

References

External links
PSA Cathay Pacific Hong Kong Open 2012 website
Cathay Pacific Hong Kong Open 2011 official website
Cathay Pacific Hong Kong Open 2011 Squash Site website
Cathay Pacific Hong Kong Open 2012 Squashinfo website

Squash tournaments in Hong Kong
Men's Hong Kong Open (squash)
Men's Hong Kong Open (squash)